The elongated shrew (Crocidura elongata) is a species of mammal in the family Soricidae. It is endemic to the island of Sulawesi in Indonesia. It lives in the forests of central, northern, and eastern Sulawesi from 200 to 2000 meters elevation.

References

Crocidura
Endemic fauna of Indonesia
Mammals of Indonesia
Mammals described in 1921
Taxa named by Ned Hollister
Taxa named by Gerrit Smith Miller Jr.
Taxonomy articles created by Polbot